Nandikar is a theatre group in India. The group has its headquarters in Kolkata in the state of West Bengal, but works around the world.

History
Nandikar's story begins on 29 June 1960 at maternal uncle's house of Asit Bandyopadhyay at B K Pal Avenue. In the presence of Ajitesh Bandyopadhyay, Asit Bandyopadhyay and some friends of Manindra College like Dipen Sengupta, Satyen Mitra, Ajay Ganguly, Mahesh Singh and Chinmoy Roy, 'Nandikar' was established on June 29, 1960. Members of the party's first executive committee were elected: President Ajitesh Banerjee, Secretary Asit Banerjee, Assistant Secretary Ajay Ganguly and Treasurer Satyen Mitra.
One of the founding members Dipen Sengupta named the group party Nandikar. The logo was designed by none other than Satyajit Ray.
The group was later joined by Keya Chakraborty, Bibhas Chakraborty, Ashok Mukhopadhyay and Rudra Prasad Sengupta.
The group's early productions were mainly adaptations of non-Indian dramas, such as Six Characters in Search of a Playwright (Luigi Pirandale's' Six Characters in Search of an Author '), Manzuri Amer Manzuri (Chekhov's' Cherry Orchard'), Jokhan Ika (Arnold ',' Arnold ' Sher Afghan (Pirandello's 'Henry Eve') and the three-penny turn (Bertolt Brecht's 'Three Penny Opera'). They have also produced four chapters of Rabindranath Tagore. This period was the golden era of Nandikar which witnessed stalwarts Ajitesh Bandopadhyay, Asit Bandopadhyay, Rudra Prasad Sengupta and Keya Chakraborty performed together on many plays.

In the early 1970s, Asit Bandopadhyay and then late 1970s Ajitesh Bandopadhyay left the group. With Rudraprasad Sengupta as the main director, a new era started, and Nandikar turned from a pure performance-oriented theatre group to an organisation with a wide range of projects, including the annual National Theatre Festival.

Among the group's present actresses and actors are Swatilekha Sengupta, who starred in Satyajit Ray's movie Ghare Baire (The Home and the World) (1984) and Roland Joffé's City of Joy (1992), Goutam Halder, (he has left the group and formed a new one, initially becoming its director), Debshankar Halder, Sohini Sengupta, who acted in Aparna Sen's movie Paromitar Ek Din (2000), and Rudraprasad Sengupta himself. Besides acting in Nandikar productions, he has also played in Bernardo Bertolucci's Little Buddha (1993).

Nandikar regularly performs all over India. However, during the last decade, the group has performed in several countries outside India, including Bangladesh, Germany, Sweden, UK, and United States.

Plays
2019 --- Manush - direction : Sohini Sengupta, based on Prafulla Roy's novel
2019 --- Prithibi Rasta Shabdo - direction Rudraprasad Sengupta, play Saptarshi Maulik
2018 --- Bahoner Baynakka - direction Arghya Dey Sarkar, based on Dipanwita Roy's story
2018 --- Mrityunjoy - direction Sohini Sengupta, play Saptarshi Maulik
2018 --- Byatikram - direction Rudraprasad Sengupta, based on Bertolt Brecht's play 
2017 --- Rani Kadambini - direction Sohini Sengupta, based on Narayan Sanyal's novel
2016 --- Alipha - direction Sohini Sengupta, drama Poile Sengupta
2016 --- Panchajanya - direction Sohini Sengupta, original score & co-direction: Parthapratim Deb
2014 --- Bipannata - direction Sohini Sengupta
2013 --- Nachni - music, drama and direction Partha Pratim Deb, based on Subrata Mukhopadhya's novel.
2009 --- Madhabi - direction Swatilekha Sengupta, Based on Visma Sahni's drama
2008 --- Agnyatobaas - direction Sumanto Gangopaddhay, based on Sukanta Gangopaddhyay's story
2007 --- Jaha Chai... - direction Rudraprasad Sengupta & Goutam Haldar
2005 --- Barda - Based on Munshi Premchand's story Bade Bhai Sahab, Direction Goutam Haldar
2005 --- Chokh Gyalo - Written by Tarashankar Bandyopadhyay, Direction Goutam Haldar
2005 --- Bappaditya - Written by Abanindranath Tagore, direction Goutam Haldar
2004 --- Dulia - Written by Leela Mazumdar, direction Swatilekha Sengupta & Goutam Haldar
2004 --- Andharmoni - Written by Leela Mazumdar, direction Swatilekha Sengupta & Goutam Haldar
2003 --- Sojon Baadiyar Ghat - Based on a poem by Jasimuddin, Direction Gautam Haldar
2001 --- Football - Adaptation of Peter Terson's Zigger Zagger, Direction Swatilekha Sengupta
2000 --- Ei Sahar Ei Samay
1999 --- Maramiya Mon/The Gentle Spirit - Adaptation of F. Dostoevsky's The Gentle Spirit, Direction Goutam Haldar
1998 --- Brechter Khonje - A centenary tribute to Brecht
1998 --- Shanu Roychowdhury - Adaptation of Willy Russell's Shirley Valentine, direction Swatilekha Sengupta.
1997 --- Nagar Keertan
1996 --- Gotraheen
1995 --- Meghnad Badh Kabya
1994 --- Feriwalaar Mrityu
1988 --- Shesh Sakshatkaar

Projects
In-house workshops: Initiated as means to recruit and train new Nandikar-members. Annual in-house production-oriented theatre training.
Theatre with the Youth: Initiated in 1980, still running. Consist of production-oriented training both within the group, and vis-à-vis independent and young theatre troupes.
National Theatre Festival: Initiated in 1984, still running. Organised under the objective to provide a counterbalance from the cultural world against divisive and disintegrating tendencies rocking the sub-continent and to create a forum for an interaction of multi-lingual and multi-cultural theatre forms.
Theatre-In-Education: Initiated in 1989, still running. The main aim as they present it in "Nandikar Profile" is to let the school children know their milieu and perceive their world through theatre, to initiate their analysis of his milieu, to sharpen the interface between the "I and the World" and help them assume the role of world-changers. As part of the project there have been arranged training for 250 teachers from 80 schools in West-Bengal, short-term workshops at 96 schools and longer-term workshops at 32 schools resulting in stage performances. Nandikar has also documented their TIE-project, made video modules and published a book on theatre games (Sengupta 2000) and a collection of plays for children (Nandikar 2000). One of these projects is "Journey into Theatre", the annual workshop Nandikar organizes with the Dramatics Cell, Indian Institute of Management Calcutta.
Secondary Schools: Initiated in 1989, still running. Nandikar is often asked to give production-oriented workshops to older children. Same objectives as TIE-project.
Kolkata Rescue: Initiated in 1992, ended in 1998. A project of theatre activities for disadvantaged and handicapped children. Accomplished together with the non-formal educational-cum-social organisation, Kolkata Rescue.
Nivedita Colony: Initiated in 1992, ended a couple of years later. Work with children of the suburban Nivedita Colony of poor Bangladeshian immigrants.
Theatre with Visually Challenged (Blind Opera): Initiated in 1994, last production with Nandikar participation in 1996.
Theatre with Sex Workers: Initiated in the 1990s, finalized. Production-oriented training in co-operation with Komal Gandhar, an organisation of sex workers.

References

External links
 Official website

Theatre in Kolkata
Theatrical organisations in India
Theatre companies in India
Organizations established in 1960
Bengali theatre groups